Porter 'n' Dolly is the eleventh collaborative studio album by Porter Wagoner and Dolly Parton. It was released on August 19, 1974, by RCA Victor. Though they had each topped the U.S. country singles chart individually many times, "Please Don't Stop Loving Me", from this album, was their only duet to reach #1 on the U.S. country singles chart.

Parton re-recorded "The Fire That Keeps You Warm" for her 1976 album All I Can Do.

Parton also re-recorded "Together You and I" for her 2011 album, Better Day.

Critical reception
Billboard gave a positive review of the album, noting that all of the album's tracks were written by Wagoner and Parton. They continued by saying the album contains "some nice ballads, some up-tempo, but [they are] all good listening." The review indicated "We'd Have to Be Crazy", "Two", and "The Power of Love" as the best cuts on the album. The review concluded with a note to record dealers that the album's "portrait cover will enhance display."

In another positive review, Cashbox said, "Although Porter and Dolly have each assumed their own artistic identities as far as live performing, they are still recording together. This new LP features some excellent material and the inimitable duo are sounding better than ever. The LP is a sparkling collection and Porter and Dolly have always stood as an exceptional duo on the country music scene. "Please Don't Stop Loving Me" is an up-tempo ditty that professes that they need each other. "The Fire That Keeps You Warm" is a heart warming tune that tells of true love."

Recording
Recording sessions for the album took place on May 23 and 24, 1974, at RCA Studio B in Nashville, Tennessee. These two sessions produced eight of the album's ten tracks. The two other tracks were recorded during sessions for previous albums. "Sounds of Nature" was recorded during a September 30, 1971 session for 1972's The Right Combination • Burning the Midnight Oil and "Together You and I" was recorded during the May 1, 1972 session for 1972's Together Always.

Track listing
Track listing, writing credits and track length adapted from LP sleeve.

References

1974 albums
Dolly Parton albums
Porter Wagoner albums
Albums produced by Bob Ferguson (music)
RCA Records albums
Vocal duet albums